Naju is a city in South Jeolla Province, South Korea.

The capital of South Jeolla was located at Naju until it was moved to Gwangju in 1895. The name Jeolla actually originates from the first character of Jeonju and the first character of Naju (nowadays spelled and pronounced 나/na according to the South Korean standard). Dongshin University is situated in Naju. Naju is famous for the Naju Pear which is a large round pear that forms its district logo.

History 
 In the Later Three Kingdoms period of Korean history, Wang Geon (later Taejo of Goryeo Dynasty) occupied the Naju area, which was then part of Later Baekje Kingdom and came to become large base of his political support.  He also married the daughter of the Magistrate of Naju, Lady Janghwa, who became the mother of Goryeo's second King Hyejong of Goryeo.
 In 1986, the governmental name was changed from Geumseong to Naju.
 In 1995, Naju city was expanded to include Naju county.

Climate

Products
A well-known local product is the Naju pear, which has long been cultivated along the Yeongsan River.

Naju pears and muskmelons are popular as gifts for Lunar New Year and other holidays.

Innovation city
Naju was designated an Innovation City and the opening ceremony for city construction was held on November 8, 2007. President Roh participated in the opening events.

As the city won the title of "Innovation City", several public organizations have relocated to here from Seoul. Start of the construction was 4th in line after Jeju, Gimcheon and Jinju.
The organizations that were the targeted for moving are:

Energy 
 Korea Electric Power Corporation (KEPCO)
 KEPCO Plant Service & Engineering Co., Ltd. (KEPCO KPS)
 Korea Electric Power Data Network Co. Ltd. (KEPCO KDN)
 Korea Power Exchange (KPX)

IT & Communications 
 Korea Post Information Center (KPIC)
 Korea Internet & Security Agency (KISA)
 National Radio Research Agency (RRA)
 Korea Communications Agency (KCA)

Agriculture 
 Korea Rural Community Corporation (KRC)
 Korea Agro-Fisheries & Food Trade Corporation (aT)
 Korea Rural Economic Institute (KREI)
 Food and Agriculture Officials Training Institute (ATI)
 Korea Institute of Planning and Evaluation for Technology in Food, Agriculture and Forestry (IPET)

Culture & Others 
 Arts Council Korea (ARKO)
 Korea Creative Content Agency (KOCCA)
 Teachers' Pension (TP)

The new city is set to be  in area with the grand plan of developing it into a cultural center in the southwestern economy.

Near the Innovation City is the Naju Pear Museum and Pear Orchard for Tourists (나주배박물관 및 배밭 관광체험), which is dedicated to the Asian pear; all of its displays are in Korean.

Notable People
Jin Hyeon Ju (Stage Name Belle) - member of KPop group Cignature

Symbols
 Flower: Pear blossoms
 Bird: Dove
 Tree: Ginkgo Tree

Festivals
 Naju Pear Blossom Festival in April
 Naju Rapeseed Festival in May
 Naju Yeongsanpo Skate Festival in May

International relations

Twin towns and sister cities
Naju is twinned with:
  Kurayoshi, Tottori, Japan
  Wenatchee, Washington, United States
  Isaac, Queensland, Australia
  Nanchang, Jiangxi, China (since 2007)

Culture
The drama Jumong was filmed in Naju. An amusement park called 'Samhanji Theme Park' was used for the film set because of its traditional sceneries. The 2021 drama Nevertheless also had scenes filmed in Naju.

It hosts events such as hands-on experience on natural dyeing process for children. Many elementary schools are registering for this program.

See also
 List of cities in South Korea

References

External links
 City's Official Website

 
Cities in South Jeolla Province